Ağarəhimoba (also, Agharahimoba) is a village in the Khachmaz District of Azerbaijan.The village forms part of the municipality of Gardashoba.

References 

Populated places in Khachmaz District